Estadio Obdulio Varela is a multi-use stadium in Montevideo, Uruguay.  It is currently used mostly for football matches and serves as the home stadium for Villa Española of the Primera División Uruguaya.  The stadium holds 8,000 spectators and opened in 2002.

External links
Stadium information

Multi-purpose stadiums in Uruguay
O